Daniel Svensson (born 4 January 1983) is a Swedish footballer who plays for BK Olympic on loan from Lunds BK.

Career 
Svensson represents Östers IF, a club which he joined from Markaryds IF in 2005. He plays as a defensive midfielder, but has regularly been left out of the team while at Öster. in January 2008 signed a contract with new created club LB07. After two years with IF Limhamn-Bunkeflo left the club and signed 2010 with Lunds BK. On 18 November 2010 Svensson left his club Lunds BK and moved on loaned to BK Olympic.

Personal life 
Svensson works in the military.

References 

1983 births
Living people
Östers IF players
Swedish footballers
BK Olympic players
Association football midfielders